Oksana Gennadyevna Borodina (née Fedorova, ; born 17 December 1977), known professionally as Oxana Fedorova, is a Russian television presenter, singer, actress, fashion designer, model and beauty queen. Outside of her career in the entertainment industry, Fedorova is a former police officer.

Fedorova began her career in the entertainment industry as a model, later becoming Miss Saint Petersburg 1999 and Miss Russia 2001. She went on to win Miss Universe 2002, becoming the first Russian entrant to win Miss Universe. She reigned for 119 days until becoming the first Miss Universe to be dethroned (the reasons for which are not entirely clear), after which she began a career in television, hosting shows such as Good Night, Little Ones! and Fort Boyard: Russia. She has also participated in numerous charity projects, becoming a UNICEF Goodwill Ambassador in 2007. She said in 2016 she became annoyed and frustrated during Donald Trump’s presidential campaign because Western media pestered her for information to apparently defame the billionaire.

Early life and education
Fedorova was born in Pskov to parents Gennadiy Fedorov, a nuclear physicist, and Elena Fedorova (née Trofimovich), a psychiatric nurse. Her parents divorced when she was three years old, and her father subsequently left the family. She was raised as an only child and was brought up by her mother and maternal grandparents. From 1985-1995, she attended lyceum at Pskov and was the captain of the volleyball team and learned to play the guitar while in school. After graduation, she tried to begin a modeling career but various modeling agencies in Saint Petersburg and Moscow were not interested in her.

Mikhail Grigoryevich Vasilyev, her maternal grandmother's father, had been a police officer at Saint Petersburg before and during the Great Patriotic War after which he was transferred to Pskov for more police duties and received the award "Honorary Citizen of the City of Pskov" for his police work there. Her maternal grandfather Alexey Trofimovich Kulikov encouraged her to continue the family tradition of duty to the country and become a police officer.

After working as a police officer in Pskov, she moved to Saint Petersburg to attend the Saint Petersburg University of the Ministry of Internal Affairs of Russia. While a student, she worked as an investigator for the Pulkovo Transport Police.

Fedorova graduated from university in 2000, and later began post-graduate studies at the same university. She wrote her thesis on "Regulation of Private Detective and Security Activity in the Russian Federation," and also taught civil law to younger students. In 2002, Fedorova successfully defended her doctoral thesis, and subsequently, she obtained her Doctor of Philosophy degree in civil law from the Saint Petersburg University of the Ministry of Internal Affairs of Russia in 2003. After receiving her doctorate, she continued to teach at the Saint Petersburg University of the Ministry of Interior of Russia.

Career

Police career
Fedorova enrolled in the police academy as a teenager, where she played the saxophone in the academy's brass band. After graduating, Fedorova worked as an inspector in Pskov for six months. While a university student in Saint Petersburg, she worked as an investigator for the Pulkovo Transport Police. After finishing her doctorate in 2005, she continued her career as a police officer, being promoted to captain in September 2002 and major in 2005.

Modeling and pageantry
In 1999, Fedorova began working professionally as a model, and later became introduced to beauty pageants. That year, she was named Miss Saint Petersburg and Miss Kalokagathia. In 2001, she represented Saint Petersburg at Miss Russia, where she was declared the winner.

As a model, Fedorova has walked runways for designers such as Tony Ward and Yulia Yanina, in addition to participating in fashion weeks in Rome, Milan, and Moscow.

Miss Universe 2002
As Miss Russia 2001, Fedorova was selected to represent Russia at Miss Universe 2002, held in San Juan, Puerto Rico. Her work visa from Russia was delayed due to tensions between Russia and the United States over upcoming nuclear weapons discussions between United States President George W. Bush and Russian President Vladimir Putin, so she arrived at San Juan much later than other contestants. Donald Trump, owner of the Miss Universe Organization said, "This is an unusual year, and these countries are right in the middle of a lot of turmoil. It's tough stuff. Once they're [in San Juan] they feel safe, but it's the getting there that concerns some of them." Fedorova won both the swimsuit and evening gown competitions by large margins over the other nine semi-finalists. Upon being crowned Miss Universe 2002, Fedorova was given multiple honors and gifts. Russian designer Helen Yarmak created a doll for her. Fedorova traveled to Canada, France, Greece, Indonesia, Italy, Kenya, Panama, Puerto Rico, and the United States as Miss Universe 2002.

In Kenya, Fedorova toured HIV/AIDS programs in and around Nairobi, including AIDS orphanages. When she was in Indonesia, she visited Borobudur in Central Java with Miss Indonesia 2002 Melanie Putria Dewita Sari. They also met the President of Indonesia Megawati Sukarnoputri at her residence Istana Negara. In Paris, Fedorova attended the 131st General Assembly of the International Exhibitions Bureau, where she met Nobel Prize winner in physics Zhores Alfyorov. In Italy, Fedorova helped crown Miss Universe Italy 2003 Silvia Ceccon, and while visiting
Canada, Fedorova attended the 2002 Toronto International Film Festival. In Panama, Fedorova attended the contract signing that made Panama the host country of the Miss Universe 2003 competition, and in September 2002, Fedorova returned to Puerto Rico to help crown Miss Puerto Rico Universe 2003 Carla Tricoli.

A few months after Fedorova's crowning, she was rumored to be pregnant, and was later dethroned by the Miss Universe Organization. Fedorova denied the pregnancy rumors and stated that she voluntarily gave up her crown for personal reasons, mainly because she wanted to finish her law degree. She later stated in an interview that she had declined to perform her duties because she was so insulted by her treatment on The Howard Stern Show. She blamed the pageant organizers for not warning her of the sexual questions Howard Stern frequently asks. The Mikimoto Crown was passed on to first-runner up Justine Pasek of Panama, who subsequently became her country's first Miss Universe. Fedorova was the first Miss Universe to be dethroned.

Film and television career
Following her dethronement in 2003, Fedorova began pursuing a career in television after she was given an offer to host Star Factory for Channel One but she turned it down and later being selected to host the long-running Russian children's program Good Night, Little Ones! for the VGTRK, beginning in January 2003. The show won the TEFI award for Best Children's Show in October 2003. She went on to cohost the show Subbotnik on Russia-1 from 2004 to 2010. She hosted the Russian national selections for the Junior Eurovision Song Contest 2009 and Eurovision Song Contest 2010, in addition to serving as Russia's spokesperson for the 2008, 2010, and 2012 Eurovision Song Contests. In 2014, she began hosting the style and fashion program Koroleva krasoty.

In 2006, Fedorova competed in the second season of the Russian version of Dancing with the Stars. She came in fifth place. She additionally appeared as a guest judge on the Russian version of Project Runway in 2011, and as a contestant on the Russian version of Name That Tune in 2014. As a voice actress, Fedorova has voiced Russian language versions of Barbie in Toy Story 3 and Queen Clarion in the Tinker Bell film series.

Music career
Fedorova began her music career in 2009, releasing the single "Prava lyubov" with Nikolay Baskov. The song went on to win Duet of the Year at the 2010 Golden Gramophone Awards. She later released the solo single "Na shag odin" in 2010. Her debut studio album Na krayu u lyubvi was released in 2011. She released the single "Moya doktrina" in 2013.
Fedorova and Russian tenor, Dmitry Galikhin released the official video of their Spanish duet "Historia de un Amor" in 2019.

Other ventures
In 2008, Fedorova released her first book The Formula of Style. The book contained beauty and style advice, in addition to autobiographical information on Fedorova. In 2010, she became the editor-in-chief of MODA TOPICAL Magazine. Fedorova launched her fashion line OFERA in 2014. It made its debut at the Spring/Summer 2015 Mercedes-Benz Fashion Week in Moscow.

Fedorova has partaken in numerous charity projects. She has been a member of UNICEF since 2006, and became a UNICEF Goodwill Ambassador in 2007. Fedorova is additionally a member of the Board of Advisors for the Russian Children's Welfare Society. She created the charity Speshite delat dobro! in October 2009 with the assistance of the Russian Ministry of Defence. The foundation provides support to orphans and children in difficult situations, providing specific attention to orphaned children of parents who died while serving in the Russian Ministry of Internal Affairs or Russian Armed Forces. In 2011, Fedorova founded a school in Ufa for girls ages 10–16.

Personal life
Fedorova is a practicing Russian Orthodox Christian. In 2007, Fedorova married German model Philip Toft in Munich. They divorced in 2010. In 2011, Fedorova married Andrey Borodin, a KGB officer, member of the Presidential Administration of Russia, and vice president of the Russian Boxing Federation. Fedorova and Borodin have two children together; a son born in 2012 and a daughter born in 2013.

Since she was three years old, Fedorova had no contact with her father. In 2005, she attempted to locate him but discovered that he had died.

Fedorova had previously participated in campaigns for the Russian Party of Life.

Discography
Na krayu u lyubvi (2011)

Filmography

Awards and nominations
 1999 — Miss St. Petersburg
 2001 — Miss Russia
 2002 — Miss Universe 2002

 2012 — BIAF for contribution to charity (Lebanon, Beirut)

References

External links

1977 births
21st-century Russian actresses
Beauty pageant controversies
Living people
Miss Russia winners
Miss Universe 2002 contestants
Miss Universe winners
People from Pskov
Russian beauty pageant winners
Russian fashion designers
Russian women singers
Russian film actresses
Russian Orthodox Christians from Russia
Russian police officers
Russian television actresses
Russian television presenters
Russian voice actresses
UNICEF Goodwill Ambassadors
Women police officers
Russian women television presenters
Russian women fashion designers
Controversies in Russia
Winners of the Golden Gramophone Award